Al Gross may refer to:
Al Gross (politician) (born 1962), Alaskan politician, orthopedic surgeon, commercial fisherman
Al Gross (American football) (born 1961), American football player 
Al Gross (broadcaster), American broadcaster and voice actor
Al Gross (engineer) (1918–2000), pioneer in mobile wireless communication